Tornaco may refer to:

 Tornaco, Piedmont, a commune in north-western Italy
 Tornaco Castle, a castle in southern Belgium
 De Tornaco family
 Charles Auguste de Tornaco (1763-1837), industrialist and politician
 Camille de Tornaco (1807 – 1880), Belgian politician
 Victor de Tornaco (1805 – 1875), Belgian-Luxembourgian politician and Prime Minister of Luxembourg
 Charles de Tornaco (1927 – 1953), Belgian motor racer